Brian Anthony Benning (born June 10, 1966) is a Canadian former professional ice hockey defenceman who played ten seasons in the National Hockey League (NHL) with the St. Louis Blues, Los Angeles Kings, Philadelphia Flyers, Edmonton Oilers, and Florida Panthers. He is the younger brother of former Vancouver Canucks general manager Jim Benning. He is also the father of Nashville Predators defenceman Matt Benning.

Playing career
Benning was drafted by the St. Louis Blues in the 2nd round, 26th overall in the 1984 NHL Entry Draft. He made his debut in the NHL during the 1984–1985 season with the Blues, playing in 4 games. Benning finally got the chance to have a full-time job in the NHL during the 1986–1987 season. That year he played in 78 games with the Blues and scored a career high 49 points. Benning then played 2 more full seasons with the Blues before being traded at the beginning of the 1989–1990 to the Los Angeles Kings. He played 3 seasons there before having brief stints with the Philadelphia Flyers and Edmonton Oilers.

Benning finished out his career with the Florida Panthers. He was on the original 1993–1994 Panthers team that surprised many by nearly making the playoffs. He retired after the 1994–1995 season.

Career statistics

Regular season and playoffs

International

Awards and honours

References

External links
 

1966 births
Canadian ice hockey defencemen
Edmonton Oilers players
Florida Panthers players
Ice hockey people from Edmonton
Kamloops Blazers players
Living people
Los Angeles Kings players
Philadelphia Flyers players
Portland Winterhawks players
St. Albert Saints players
St. Louis Blues draft picks
St. Louis Blues players